The Virginia Tech Sports Network is the radio network broadcasting athletic events of the Virginia Tech Hokies games, primarily football and men's basketball. The radio network was managed by ISP Sports until that company merged into IMG (now known as Learfield IMG College) in 2010.

Stations

References 

College basketball on the radio in the United States
College football on the radio
Sports radio in the United States 
Virginia Tech Hokies
Learfield IMG College sports radio networks